Kirkman "Kirk" Finlay Jr. (August 16, 1936 – June 27, 1993) was an American lawyer and politician who served on the Columbia, South Carolina city council from 1974 to 1978 and as that city's mayor from 1978 to 1986. He died of brain cancer in 1993 at the age of 56.

His son, Kirkman Finlay III, followed in his footsteps and was elected to Columbia city council before running successfully for a seat in the South Carolina House of Representatives.

References

1936 births
1993 deaths
Mayors of Columbia, South Carolina
South Carolina Democrats
South Carolina Republicans
Harvard Law School alumni
20th-century American politicians
Lawyers from Columbia, South Carolina
Sewanee: The University of the South alumni
Deaths from cancer in South Carolina
20th-century American lawyers